Gauri (first edition: 2015 BS (1959–60 AD)) is an eponymous tragic epic written by Nepali "National Poet" Madhav Prasad Ghimire, in memory of his first wife, following her premature death. It is widely regarded as one of the poet's finest works; it is also the most popular. Ghimire has named Gauri as one of his favourites, among his works.

Inspiration
Madhav Prasad Ghimire, at fifteen years of age, was married to his first wife Gauri Pokharel, herself aged only ten, in 1990 BS. She died after eleven years of marriage in which they had two children together.

Development
In Mādhava Ghimirekā viśishṭa khaṇḍakāvya, Bhanubhakta Pokharel opined that most of the epic seems to have been completed by 2005 BS.

Adaptation 
A music album of the epic was released which was sung by artist like Ram Krishna Dhakal, Sudesh Sharma, Sangeeta Pradhan Rana, Rambhakta Jojiju, Sapana Shree and the poet himself. The album was released by Music Nepal music company.

Translation
A Korean translation of Gauri was published in 2018.

See also 

 Malati Mangale
 Muna Madan
 Prithviraj Chauhan

Notes

References

20th-century books
Poetry books
1960 poems
Works by Madhav Prasad Ghimire
Nepalese epics
Epic poems in Nepali
Nepali-language books